Bhau is a title used as a surname in modern times mostly by the Maharashtrian Brahmins of Goa and Maharashtra States of  India.

Notable people
 Bhau Kadam – Indian actor and comedian from Maharashtra, India
 Anna Bhau Sathe – Indian poet, Shahir and social worker
 Sadashivrao Bhau – son of Chimaji Appa and Rakhmabai and the nephew of Peshwa Bajirao I
 Bhau Daji – Indian physician, Sanskrit scholar, and antiquary

References

Indian surnames